Miss World 2003 was the 53rd edition of the Miss World pageant, held at the Crown of Beauty Theatre in Sanya, China on 6 December 2003. 

At the end of the event, Azra Akın of Turkey crowned Rosanna Davison of Ireland as Miss World 2003. It is Ireland's first victory in the history of the pageant. 

Contestants 106 contestants competed in this year's pageant, surpassing the previous record of 95 contestants in 2000. The pageant was hosted by Phil Keoghan, Amanda Byram, and Angela Chow. Luis Fonsi and Bryan Ferry performed in this year's pageant.

Results

Placements

Continental Queens of Beauty

Contestants
106 contestants competed for the title.

Judges
Miss World 2003 had nine judges.
 Candace Bushnell 
 Jackie Chan 
 Agbani Darego – Miss World 2001 from Nigeria 
 Bruce Forsyth† 
 Gustavo Gianetti 
 Julia Morley – Chairwoman of the Miss World Organisation 
 Krish Naidoo 
 Clive Robertson 
 Dick Zimmermann

Notes

Debuts

Returns

Last competed in 1981:
 
Last competed in 1998:
 
Last competed in 1999:
 
Last competed in 2000:
 
 
 
 
 
 
 
Last competed in 2001:

Withdrawals
  – Lusine Tovmasyan - She withdrew due to financial problems. She later competed at Miss Europe 2005 and finished 1st Runner-up.
  – Aishwarya Sukhdeo - She withdrew at the last minute for unknown reasons. however, she competed in Miss World a year later.

No Shows
  – Mounia Achlaf
  – Miss Austria 2003, Tanja Duhovich did not compete due to not meeting the age requirements, she was just 17. Then the Miss Austria corporation decided to appoint the Miss Austria 2003 second runner up, Bianca Zudrell at the last minute with no time to prepare her visa.
  – Alexandrya Evans. She competed at Miss Universe 2011 8 years later.
  – No contest
  - No Contest
  – Mable Pulu
  - Heitiare Tribondeau
 - No contest 
  – Did not compete because of a shift in the Miss Ghana calendar. Organizers held the national final, Miss Ghana 2003, on the same day Miss World 2003 was held. This is the reason Ghanaian delegates to Miss World have their titles dating back by a year.

Replacements
  – Agnese Eiduka
  – Isabelle Jonsson - She was the first runner up of Fröken Sverige 2003, but the organization just lost the MW licence that year to the newly Miss World Sweden contest.
  – Amara Barroeta Seijas.

Country Changes
 Yugoslavia changed its name to Serbia and Montenegro.

Other notes
 Northern Marianas was originally crowned for the Miss Universe pageant but was sent to Miss World instead.

References

External links
 Pageantopolis – Miss World 2003
 
 http://www.grahamecurtis.com/irishconnectionsmag/archives/v5i1/missworld.htm

Miss World
2003 in China
2003 beauty pageants
Beauty pageants in China
December 2003 events in China